Jerald A. "Jerry" Parisella is an American politician who represents the 6th Essex district in the Massachusetts House of Representatives.

Parisella graduated from Emerson College in 1988 with a bachelor's degree in journalism. He worked as a reporter for the Salem Evening News from 1989 until 1991, when he became Congressman Nicholas Mavroules' press secretary.

In 1997, Parisella graduated from the New England School of Law. A year later he became an assistant city solicitor in Beverly, Massachusetts. In 2000, Parisella gave up his solicitor's job to join the law firm of Alexander & Femino, where he still practices. From 2006–2011, he was also an assistant city solicitor in Salem, Massachusetts.

Parisella is a lieutenant colonel in the Massachusetts National Guard, serving as a Judge Advocate General.  In 2011 he deployed to Iraq with the 804th Medical Brigade. He currently serves in the 151st Regional Support Group. He formerly served in the US. Army Reserves with State Rep Harold Naughton, Jr. and State Senator John Velis

See also
 2019–2020 Massachusetts legislature
 2021–2022 Massachusetts legislature

References

Democratic Party members of the Massachusetts House of Representatives
People from Beverly, Massachusetts
Emerson College alumni
New England Law Boston alumni
American male journalists
American public relations people
United States Army officers
Living people
21st-century American politicians
Year of birth missing (living people)
Military personnel from Massachusetts